Allan Cox (11 November 1873 – 5 January 1896) was a Barbadian cricketer. He played in one first-class match for the Barbados cricket team in 1895/96.

See also
 List of Barbadian representative cricketers

References

External links
 

1873 births
1896 deaths
Barbadian cricketers
Barbados cricketers
People from Saint Joseph, Barbados